Czerwona Woda may refer to the following places in Poland:
Czerwona Woda, Lower Silesian Voivodeship (south-west Poland)
Czerwona Woda, Iława County in Warmian-Masurian Voivodeship (north Poland)
Czerwona Woda, Olsztyn County in Warmian-Masurian Voivodeship (north Poland)